Samuel Brown (1821–1886) was an American pioneer and politician. He was a member of the Oregon State Senate from 1866 to 1872.

Early life
He was born in Pennsylvania and moved to Indiana and then Missouri, where he was married. He worked as a carpenter and cabinet maker.

Migration to Oregon
In 1846, he and his family went by wagon train to the American West Coast. They accompanied Jesse Applegate on what became known as the Applegate Trail.

He built a mill on the Feather River in California, and made $20,000 prospecting for gold.

The family then moved to Oregon, and had the Sam Brown House built near present-day Gervais in 1857; the house is thought to be the first architect-designed house built in the state.

Brown's son, Sam H. Brown, also served in the Oregon Senate, and ran for governor of Oregon in 1934 and 1938.

See also

 List of people from Oregon
 List of people from Pennsylvania

References 

Oregon pioneers
Oregon state senators
1821 births
1886 deaths
People of the California Gold Rush
People from Gervais, Oregon
Place of birth missing
Place of death missing
19th-century American politicians